The 2014 Geko Ypres Rally was the 50th running of the event and the sixth round of the 2014 European Rally Championship season. The event was won by Freddy Loix and Johan Gitsels. It was Loix's ninth Ypres rally victory.

The ERC Juniors category was won by Stéphane Lefebvre and Thomas Dubois,

Results

References
Rally results at ewrc-results.com

External links 
 The official website for the rally

2014 in Belgian motorsport
2014 European Rally Championship season
2014